Arkham is a fictional city in Massachusetts created by H. P. Lovecraft.

Arkham may also refer to:

Arkham Asylum, a fictional psychiatric hospital in the DC Comics Universe
Amadeus Arkham, the founder of Arkham Asylum
Jeremiah Arkham, the current fictional head of Arkham Asylum
Arkham (Devil May Cry), one of the main antagonists in the Devil May Cry video game series
Batman: Arkham, a series of video games set in the Batman universe
"Arkham" (Gotham), a television episode